In enzymology, a L-xylose 1-dehydrogenase is an enzyme that catalyzes the chemical reaction

L-xylose + NADP+  L-xylono-1,4-lactone + NADPH + H+

Thus, the two substrates of this enzyme are L-xylose and NADP+, whereas its 3 products are L-xylono-1,4-lactone, NADPH, and H+.

This enzyme belongs to the family of oxidoreductases, specifically those acting on the CH-OH group of donor with NAD+ or NADP+ as acceptor. The systematic name of this enzyme class is L-xylose:NADP+ 1-oxidoreductase. Other names in common use include L-xylose dehydrogenase, and NADPH-xylose reductase.

References

 

EC 1.1.1
NADPH-dependent enzymes
Enzymes of unknown structure